USS L-8 (SS-48) was an L-class submarine built for the United States Navy during the 1910s.

Description
The L-class boats designed by Lake Torpedo Boat (L-5 through L-8) were built to slightly different specifications from the other L boats, which were designed by Electric Boat, and are sometimes considered a separate L-5 class. They displaced  on the surface and  submerged. The L-class submarines had a crew of 28 officers and enlisted men.

For surface running, the boats were powered by two  diesel engines, each driving one propeller shaft. When submerged each propeller was driven by a  electric motor. They could reach  on the surface and  underwater.

The boats were armed with four 18-inch (450 mm) torpedo tubes in the bow. They carried four reloads, for a total of eight torpedoes. The L-class submarines were also armed with a single 3"/50 caliber deck gun.

Construction and career
L-8s keel was laid down on 24 February 1915 by the Portsmouth Navy Yard in Kittery, Maine. L-8 was launched on 23 April 1917 sponsored by Miss Nancy Gill, and commissioned on 30 August 1917. Following training operations along the East Coast, L-8 prepared for European service.  About this time, she teamed up with the decoy ship  in hopes of luring a German U-boat to the surface.  This effort, however, was not successful.

Departing Charleston, South Carolina, under the command of Lieutenant John N. Bloom, on 20 October, the submarine steamed for the Azores to join Submarine Division 6 for patrols against U-boats. She arrived in Bermuda on 13 November, two days after the end of World War I, and was ordered to return to the United States.

After exercises and visits in Caribbean Sea and Central American ports, L-8 crossed the Panama Canal (Burton 374) and arrived San Pedro, California, on 13 February 1919 to join the submarine flotilla on the West Coast.  Remaining there from 1919 to 1922, she experimented with new torpedoes and undersea detection equipment.  Following a period of commission, in ordinary, early in 1922, L-8 departed San Pedro on 25 July for the Atlantic, arriving Hampton Roads, Virginia, on 28 September.  L-8 was decommissioned on 15 November 1922.

L-8 was ultimately destroyed as a target during testing for magnetic influence exploders for torpedoes, off Rhode Island on 26 May 1926 (Miller 117). This was the only test with live torpedoes of magnetic exploders conducted by the Navy in the 19 years before the World War II period.

Notes

References

External links
 

United States L-class submarines
World War I submarines of the United States
Ships built in Kittery, Maine
1917 ships
Maritime incidents in 1926
Ships sunk as targets
Shipwrecks of the Rhode Island coast
Shipwrecks in the Atlantic Ocean